The Sanctuary of Isis and the Magna Mater was a sanctuary in Mainz, dedicated to Isis and Magna Mater.

The temple was founded during the 1st century and remained active until at least the 3rd century. Its remains were discovered in late 1999, during construction of a shopping arcade (later named  "Römerpassage") in the city centre. Substantial excavations have been made at the site since. The remains of the building, selected finds, and a multimedia framework presentation can be viewed in a small museum in the basement of the Römerpassage. Consecration inscriptions suggest that the Flavian imperial house may have been involved in the foundation of the sanctuary.

Historical background 

Roman Mainz was founded as the legionary castrum of Mogontiacum on the Mainz Kästrich, a hill above the Rhine valley, in 13/12 B.C.. The rapidly developing Canaba, the civil vicus towards the Rhine and the public buildings of the later provincial capital, such as thermal baths, theatres, administrative buildings and temples, followed quickly, especially under the Flavian dynasty. The temple complex dates from this period.

In the sanctuary in Mogontiacum both Isis – here with the epithets Panthea ('All-Goddess') and Regina ('Queen') – and the mother goddess Magna Mater were worshipped according to the found inscriptions. Both goddesses were most probably introduced to Mainz by the Roman army, who carried religions with them in the context of the expansion of the Roman empire. The cult of Isis originates from Egypt, while the Mater Magna is a Greek adoption of the Anatolian goddess Kybele (closely related to the cult of Attis). Both cults already had a long tradition in the Roman Empire: Kybele/Magna Mater had been worshipped in Rome since the end of the 3rd century BC, while Isis had long been part of the pantheon in the Egyptian pharaonic empire, coming into contact with the Roman world through Hellenistic culture and Octavian's conquest of the Ptolemies. In the Roman republic and at the beginning of the imperial period up to Tiberius partly forbidden, the Isis cult finally established itself under Emperor Caligula. In the new province of Germania superior with its provincial capital Mogontiacum, however, these cults were new.

Since the founder of the Flavian imperial house, Emperor Vespasian, had received his destiny of rule in Alexandria from the Egyptian deity Serapis, the Flaviers had a close connection to oriental cults. The Egyptian goddess Isis was a representative of the imperial cult, comparable to the position of Venus in the Julian imperial house. In this context, bricks with military brick stamps found on site suggest that a building had been erected on behalf of the Emperor for the purpose of cult practice promoted by the Emperor.

The sanctuary was fundamentally rebuilt several times over the next 200 years and, after the first city wall was built around 250, was also located within the protected city area. Towards the end of the 3rd century AD, perhaps even later, the cult of Isis and Mater Magna was no longer practiced in Mainz. The sanctuary was abandoned and the building complex fell into disrepair. Concrete reasons for the cessation of cult activities are not known. Datable finds are mainly from the 1st and 2nd centuries and prove the active use of the sanctuary during this period. It is possible that the further processing of the extensive find material may enable a more precise dating of the useful life of the sanctuary.

Due to its peripheral location in early medieval Mainz, the site probably lay fallow for some time. Beginning with the construction of the monastery of the Poor Clares after 1330 and the construction of the Wamboldt court in a similar time frame, the site was built over with monastery complexes and patrician courts in the Middle Ages.

Rediscovery, excavation and rescue 
In 1999 one of the last inner-city areas with buildings from the 1950s was to be upgraded. In order to build a shopping arcade, the existing buildings were demolished and a correspondingly large excavation pit was dug for the foundations. The construction project was accompanied by the General Directorate for Cultural Heritage Rhineland-Palatinate. Since the Roman road in this area ran from the legionary camp towards the Rhine bridge (parts of which were uncovered during the excavations), the archaeologists involved reckoned with a typical strip house development and smaller workshops from Roman times.

At a depth of five metres at the end of 1999, two archaeologically important finds were unexpectedly discovered: the remains of a sanctuary from the Roman period and an underlying burial site from the Hallstatt period that was around 700 years older. During the subsequent archaeological excavations, both the building complex of the sanctuary and a women's grave of the Hallstatt burial ground dated 680-650 BC were documented. The excavations lasted about 17 months and ended at the beginning of 2001. Fifteen tons of soil were removed from the excavation site for further archaeobotanical and archaeozoological evaluation, in addition to 49 m³ of other recovered finds.

Initially, it was planned to remove the structural remains according to the archaeological documentation and to continue with the construction work for the shopping arcade. The Mithräum at Ballplatz, which was discovered in the 1970s and also dates back to the 1st century, suffered a similar fate. It was irretrievably destroyed during the construction work - insufficiently documented. Resistance against these plans formed among the population of Mainz and a newly founded citizens' initiative, the Initiative Römisches Mainz, collected several 10,000 signatures for the preservation of the sanctuary within a short time.

This achieved a permanent conservation of the sanctuary and its inclusion in the newly built shopping arcade. Due to the planned construction of an underground car park at this location, however, the finds had to be translocated. The structural remains of the sanctuary were dismantled in a complex procedure and moved several metres. The resulting costs of 3.43 million euros were shared between the city of Mainz and the state of Rhineland-Palatinate. Since the festive opening on 30 August 2003 - an estimated 25,000 visitors came to the Mainz city centre for the festival – the sanctuary of Isis and Mater Magna can be visited in the so-called Taberna archaeologica in the basement of the Römerpassage Mainz.

References

Ancient Roman temples
Temples of Isis
1st-century religious buildings and structures
Museums in Mainz
Germany in the Roman era
Temples of Cybele